Marco Berthelot (born December 11, 1972 in Murdochville, Quebec) is a Canadian curler from Longueuil, Quebec.

After playing lead for Michel Ferland at the 1991 Canadian Junior Curling Championships, Berthelot would be bumped up to third on Ferland's team and they won the 1992 Canadian Juniors. This qualified them for the 1993 World Junior Curling Championships where they won a silver medal - losing to Scotland (skipped by Craig Wilson) in the final.

Berthelot played at the 2000 and 2001 Canadian Mixed Curling Championship at second position for Jean-Michel Ménard and won in 2001.

In 2006, Berthelot joined up with Pierre Charette and Berthelot won his first Quebec men's provincial championship in 2007. His last provincial championship appearance was in 2009 playing for Martin Ferland where they lost in the final.

Berthelot is currently the General Manager for Curling Quebec.

External links
 

1972 births
Living people
People from Gaspésie–Îles-de-la-Madeleine
Sportspeople from Longueuil
Curlers from Quebec
Canadian mixed curling champions